Xaisomboun (also Saysomboun) was a special zone of Laos, located in the north of the country, near the capital Vientiane. The special zone was created 1994 with area split off from the provinces Vientiane, and Xiangkhoang. It was dissolved on January 13, 2006.

Administrative divisions

The province was originally made up of the following districts:
 Hom (18-03)
 Longsane (18-04)
 Phun (18-05)
 Thathom (18-02)
 Anouvong (18-01)

History
 23 September 2004 – The districts Hom and Longsane were merged. The new district, still named Hom, was reassigned to Vientiane Province.
 27 June 2005 – The districts Phun and Xaysomboun were merged, with the new district still named Xaysomboun.
 13 January 2006 – Xaysomboun District was reassigned to Vientiane Province, while Thathome District went to Xiangkhoang Province. Therefore, the special area of Xaysomboun was dissolved.

See also
 Xaisomboun Province

Subdivisions of Laos